Band from TV is a charity cover band whose members are all actors from American television series. They donate the proceeds of their performances and recordings to the charities of their choice.

Band history
Actor Greg Grunberg had the idea for Band from TV after a performance at a House of Blues with several other celebrities garnered a surprising amount of fan interest. Grunberg made several connections that he would later bring together for Band from TV: he appeared on an episode of House ("Sex Kills") starring actor and musician Hugh Laurie, as well as performing at a separate charity event with James Denton and Bob Guiney.

Band from TV made their debut at the 58th Primetime Emmy Awards TV Guide afterparty and  plays high-paying charity concerts and perform for studio albums. They contributed a song ("You Can't Always Get What You Want") to the House M.D. Original Television Soundtrack, as well as releasing their own album: Hoggin' All the Covers (recorded in July 2007).

Band from TV appeared on the 2008 Idol Gives Back charity fundraiser with Carrie Underwood's "Before He Cheats", and made their first official TV appearance on The Tonight Show with Jay Leno on January 16, 2009, performing Billy Preston's "Will It Go Round in Circles". On December 4, 2010, Band From TV performed at the Avalon Theatre in honor of Ronnie Lippin and to raise money for the Ronnie Lippin Cancer Information Resource Line. Stars such as Hugh Laurie and Jesse Spencer were on hand for the show as Spencer sang "John O'Reilly" by Charlie Robison.

Band from TV has not been very active following nearly steady performances from April 2008 to  June 2012, with only one performance in 2013, one in 2014, and seven in 2015. As of 2022 there have been no live performances since a private event in early 2016. In 2016 they released a Christmas EP through Bandcamp.

Current members

 Greg Grunberg – Drums
 James Denton - Guitar
 Jesse Spencer – Violin
 Bob Guiney – Vocals
 Adrian Pasdar – Guitar
 Scott Grimes – Keyboards
 Hugh Laurie – Keyboards, Vocals
 Teri Hatcher – Vocals

Supporting cast and guest stars
 David Anders – Vocals
 Lester Holt – Bass
 Chris Kelley – Guitar
 Bryan McCann
 Chris Mostert – Saxophone
 Barry Sarna – Keyboards
 Jon Sarna – Percussion
 Brad Savage – Bass, Vocals
 Bonnie Somerville – Vocals
 Kim Conrad - Percussion
 Jorge Garcia - vocals
 Hayden Panettiere - Voice-over
 Zachary Levi - vocals

See also 
Rock Bottom Remainders, similar band from the publishing field

References

American rock music groups
2006 establishments in the United States